Evgeny Korotkov (born December 10, 1987) is a Russian professional ice hockey forward who is currently an unrestricted free agent. He last played on a tryout for HC Neftekhimik Nizhnekamsk in the Kontinental Hockey League (KHL). Korotkov returned to HC CSKA Moscow in a trade after three seasons with Amur Khabarovsk on May 20, 2014.

References

External links

1987 births
Living people
Amur Khabarovsk players
HK Brest players
HC CSKA Moscow players
HC Khimik Voskresensk players
Krylya Sovetov Moscow players
Lokomotiv Yaroslavl players
HC Neftekhimik Nizhnekamsk players
Russian ice hockey forwards
Salavat Yulaev Ufa players
Severstal Cherepovets players
Ice hockey people from Moscow